Rynella is an unincorporated community in Iberia Parish, Louisiana, United States.

History
The community consists of a few residential dwellings and a volunteer fire department along Highway 329 (also known as the Avery Island Highway). The name Rynella allegedly is a portmanteau deriving from the last two letters of the first names of three local women, RosemaRY, PauliNE, and LeiLA McIlhenny (someone eventually adding an extra L to the resulting word). They were daughters of Edward Avery McIlhenny, a noted Louisiana conservationist who presided over McIlhenny Company, maker of Tabasco brand pepper sauce at nearby Avery Island. The McIlhenny family operated a general store at Rynella and he owned much of the land that now comprises and surrounds the community.

Footnotes

Unincorporated communities in Iberia Parish, Louisiana
McIlhenny family
Unincorporated communities in Louisiana
Acadiana